The Intrepid 35 is a Canadian sailboat that was designed by McCurdy & Rhodes as a cruiser and first built in 1983.

The Intrepid 35 is a development of the Heritage 35, with the hull built from the same molds.

Production
The design was built by Heritage Yacht Builders in Oakdale, Ontario, starting in 1983 and later by Intrepid Yachts of Taunton, Massachusetts, but it is now out of production.

Design
The Intrepid 35 is a recreational keelboat, built predominantly of fibreglass, with wood trim. It has a masthead sloop rig; a raked stem; a raised counter, reverse transom; a skeg-mounted rudder controlled by a wheel and a fixed fin keel. It displaces  and carries  of ballast.

The design has sleeping accommodation for five people, with a double "V"-berth in the bow cabin, two straight settees in the main cabin and an aft cabin with a quarter berth on the port side. The galley is located on the starboard side just forward of the companionway ladder. The galley is "L"-shaped and is equipped with a two-burner stove, an ice box and a sink. A navigation station is opposite the galley, on the port side. The head is located just aft of the bow cabin on the port side.

See also
List of sailing boat types

References

Keelboats
1980s sailboat type designs
Sailing yachts
Sailboat type designs by McCurdy & Rhodes
Sailboat types built by Heritage Yacht Builders
Sailboat types built by Intrepid Yachts